Songs Put Together For (The Broken Giant) by Palace is a CD EP released in 1996 on Drag City Records, and is the soundtrack for the 1997 film The Broken Giant, directed by Estep Nagy.

The EP was reissued as Black/Rich Music by Will Oldham on June 22, 1998, on CD and 12" vinyl.

Track listing
"Organ: Watch With Me" (retitled "Organ: Do What You Will Do" on Black/Rich Music)
"Do What You Will Do"
"The Risen Lord"
"Organ: Allowance"
"Allowance"
"Black/Rich Tune"
"Organ: Black/Rich"
"Guitar: Do What You Will Do"

1996 EPs
Will Oldham albums